Reinhart Steinbicker (1904–1935) was a German screenwriter and film director.

Selected filmography
 Invisible Opponent (1933)
 The Oil Sharks (1933)
 The Tunnel (1933, French)
 The Tunnel (1933, German)
 The Prodigal Son (1934)
 Love, Death and the Devil (1934)
 The Devil in the Bottle (1935)

References

Bibliography
 Goble, Alan. The Complete Index to Literary Sources in Film. Walter de Gruyter, 1999.

External links

1904 births
1935 deaths
People from Lippe
Film people from North Rhine-Westphalia